Pravokubansky is an urban locality (a settlement) in Karachayevsky District of the Karachay-Cherkess Republic, Russia. As of the 2010 Census, its population was 3,187.

History
It was granted urban-type settlement status in 1984.

Administrative and municipal status
Within the framework of administrative divisions, the settlement of Pravokubansky is subordinated to Karachayevsky District. As a municipal division, Pravokubansky is incorporated within Karachayevsky Municipal District as Pravokubanskoye Urban Settlement.

References

Notes

Sources

Urban-type settlements in the Karachay-Cherkess Republic